Boykinia is a small genus of plants related to the saxifrages. It contains at least nine species, known as brookfoams. Brookfoams are glandular rhizomatous creeping perennials with highly lobed or toothed leaves and inflorescences of petite flowers. They are native to North America and Asia.

Selected species
 Boykinia aconitifolia Nutt. (type) – Allegheny brookfoam
 Boykinia heucheriformis (Rydb.) Rosend.
 Boykinia intermedia (A.Heller) G.N.Jones – Sierra brookfoam
 Boykinia jamesii (Torr.) Engl.
 Boykinia lycoctonifolia (Maxim.) Engl.
 Boykinia major A.Gray – large boykinia<
 Boykinia occidentalis Torr. & A.Gray – coastal brookfoam
 Boykinia richardsonii (Hook.) A.Gray ex B.D.Jacks. – Richardson's brookfoam
 Boykinia rotundifolia Parry ex A.Gray – roundleaf brookfoam
 List source :

References

External links
Jepson Manual Treatment

 
Saxifragaceae genera